The Dents de Bertol are a multi-summited mountain of the Swiss Pennine Alps, located south of the Col de Bertol in the canton of Valais.

References

External links
 Dents de Bertol on Hikr

Mountains of the Alps
Alpine three-thousanders
Mountains of Switzerland
Mountains of Valais